Egyptians in the Netherlands are residents or citizens of the Netherlands who are of Egyptian ancestry. The community is relatively small, numbering 27,504 individuals.

Notable Egyptians in the Netherlands

 Nasr Abu Zayd, thinker and liberal theologian 
 Laura Fygi, singer
 Imaan Hammam, model
 Rami Ismail, video game developer
 Josylvio, rapper
 Ramses Shaffy, singer
 Yes-R, rapper
 Amir Zeyada, kickboxer

See also
 Arabs in Europe
 Arabs in the Netherlands
 Moroccan-Dutch
 Iraqis in the Netherlands
 Islam in the Netherlands

References

 

African diaspora in the Netherlands
Ethnic groups in the Netherlands
Arabs in the Netherlands
Netherlands
 
Muslim communities in Europe